The 2012 Texas A&M Aggies football team represented Texas A&M University in the 2012 NCAA Division I FBS football season. The Aggies were led by first-year head coach Kevin Sumlin in their first year as a member of the Southeastern Conference, playing in the SEC's Western Division. They played their home games at Kyle Field. Because the Aggies scheduled two FCS opponents, they needed seven wins in the regular season to become eligible for postseason competition (if they beat both FCS teams); Texas A&M won 10 games in the regular season (including both games against FCS opponents) and thus was bowl-eligible.

During the offseason, in anticipation of the demand for tickets from students and to comply with SEC rules, Texas A&M reallocated some student seating sections, a net gain of 128 seats bringing the student section to 30,284 seats, the largest in the nation.

On March 27, 2012, Texas A&M announced that season tickets were sold out, making it the earliest sellout in school history.

The 2012 football season was highly successful for the Aggies. The team went 11–2, with victories over then-#1 Alabama and later Oklahoma in the 2013 Cotton Bowl Classic. Quarterback Johnny Manziel became the first freshman to be awarded the Heisman Trophy, and only the second Aggie player ever to win the Heisman. Texas A&M's 5th-place finish in the AP Poll was the highest for the program since 1956.

Before the season

Previous season
In 2011, Texas A&M began the season ranked 8th in the AP Poll and 9th in the Coaches Poll. They won their first two games, but fell to ranked opponents Oklahoma State and Arkansas. The Aggies won the next three, including a 55–28 victory over rival and #20 ranked Baylor. However, A&M could not sustain success and fell in its next three, with losses to #7 Oklahoma and #17 Kansas State in 4 overtimes. After beating Kansas, Texas A&M lost its final regular season rivalry game with Texas 25–27. Following this defeat, 4-year head coach Mike Sherman was fired, and replaced by Kevin Sumlin. The Aggies defeated Northwestern in the Meineke Car Care Bowl of Texas with Tim DeRuyter as interim head coach. Texas A&M finished 7–6, unranked, and tied for 6th in the Big XII.

2012 NFL Draft
Four Texas A&M players were drafted in the 2012 NFL Draft.

After the draft, five Aggies were signed as undrafted free agents.

Spring practice
Spring Practice began on March 31 and ended with the annual Maroon & White game on April 28. It also included an open scrimmage on April 14 and the Friday Night Lights game on April 20. Senior RB Christine Michael's practice was limited, due to recovering from a torn ACL.

In the Maroon & White game, the white (offense) edged out the maroon (defense) 48–44, with the offense running over 100 plays in the first half. Ryan Swope had 8 catches for 156 yards and 2 TDs. The game was also a showcase for the battle between quarterbacks Jameill Showers and Johnny Manziel, with the former tossing 2 TDs to Malcome Kennedy and Ryan Swope, and the latter also having 1 TD to Swope. Top RB Christine Michael did not play, but other backs Ben Malena and Will Randolph still combined for 3 TDs behind a dominant offensive line led by tackle Luke Joeckel. Showers finished 20 of 31 for 203 yards and 2 TDs, while Manziel was 13 of 27 for 154 yards with 1 TD and 1 INT. Mark Snyder's new defense was led in tackles by sophomore Donnie Baggs (8) and senior Steven Jenkins (9). Senior Jonathan Stewart, sophomore Domonique Patterson, and sophomore Johntel Franklin each contributed 6 tackles and senior LB Sean Porter had 2, both sacks.

Fall practice
Fall training camp began on August 3 and ended on August 18. By August, Texas A&M had 8 different players on preseason award watch lists: Sean Porter for the Chuck Bednarik Award; Uzoma Nwachukwu and Ryan Swope for the Biletnikoff Award; Damontre Moore and Sean Porter for the Butkus Award; Luke Joeckel, Jake Matthews, and Sean Porter for the Lombardi Award; Christine Michael for the Maxwell Award; Sean Porter for the Bronco Nagurski Award; Luke Joeckel and Jake Matthews for the Outland Trophy; Patrick Lewis for the Rimington Trophy; and Christine Michael for the Doak Walker Award.

Personnel

Roster

Recruiting class
In the 2012 recruiting class, Texas A&M recruited 19 players, 5 of which were included in the ESPN 150. The class was ranked 15th in the nation by ESPN and Rivals, and 21st nationally by Scout.

Returning starters

Depth chart
Source:

Schedule

Coaching staff

Rankings

Game summaries

Florida

Sources:
Official Texas A&M Game Notes (PDF)

    
    
    
    
    
    

After Texas A&M's season opener against Louisiana Tech was postponed due to Hurricane Isaac, the Aggies began the season against SEC opponent #24 Florida. This was a historic start for redshirt freshman quarterback Johnny Manziel, who won the job in Fall practice. Manziel was the first freshman QB to start a season-opener for the Aggies since 1944. Texas A&M played well in the first half and saw promising performances from both the offense and defense, but they could not sustain the success and were held scoreless in the second half, ultimately falling 20–17 to lose their first ever SEC conference game.

Texas A&M received the ball on the opening kickoff. Their first play from scrimmage in the SEC was a false start on center Patrick Lewis; however, the offense was not slowed by this misstep and had a 14-play, 66-yard opening drive, highlighted by a 16-yard run from Johnny Manziel. On 3rd and goal from the 7, Manziel completed a pass into the endzone to an open Mike Evans, but Manziel was past the line of scrimmage, causing an Illegal Forward Pass penalty and a 4th down. Fellow redshirt freshman Taylor Bertolet made the 27-yard field goal to put the Aggies on the board first. Texas  A&M's defense struggled early, though, and with the help of a few long passes from Florida QB Jeff Driskel, the Gators had a 13-play, 75-yard drive capped of by a Mike Gillislee 4-yard TD run to take the lead 7–3. But the Aggies' offense showed no signs of slowing, as they drove all the way to the Florida 14 before the 1st Quarter ended.

Three plays into the 2nd Quarter and the Aggies had scored their first SEC touchdown—an 11-yard scramble by Johnny Manziel. Texas A&M took the lead back 10–7. Florida's next series began with Jeff Driskel being sacked by DE Damontre Moore. The Gators didn't move far before Driskel was sacked twice more, first by Steven Jenkens and then a second time by Moore, forcing a punt. On A&M's next drive, Manziel connected with freshman RB Trey Williams for 28 yards and then on a trick play, WR Kenric McNeal completed a pass to Mike Evans for 27. Near the goal line, the Aggies pounded the ball in with senior RB Christine Michael to extend the lead, 17–7. On the next possession, Driskel was again sacked by Moore, but made up the yardage with a long 30-yard pass to Jordan Reed. At the A&M 28, Driskel was sacked for the fifth time of the game by senior DT Spencer Nealy. On 4th and 12 at A&M's 33, the Gators' Caleb Sturgis attempted a long 51-yard field goal and missed; however, Texas A&M took a timeout prior to the snap, and on his second try Sturgis knocked it home to reduce the Aggies' lead to 17–-10. Back on offense, the Aggies could not get down the field before the half ended; the score still 17–10 Texas A&M.

Florida received the ball coming back from the half, and wasted no time moving the ball downfield on the ground, highlighted by Mike Gillislee rushing for 24 and Driskel scrambling for 12. Ultimately the drive stalled inside the 10 and Florida had to settle for another Sturgis field goal, chipping the lead down to 17–13. Texas A&M's offense never got going in the second half however, and their first possession gained only 8 yards, forcing the first put of the game for Ryan Epperson. The teams traded defensive blows for the next few possessions: Florida's 2nd of the half gained only 11 after Driskel was sacked 2 more times by Nealy and Porter. A&M totaled −1 on their ensuing drive, and after the Gators received the punt, they could not sustain the ground attack and gave the ball back to the Aggies for a possession stifled by a personal foul penalty to end the 3rd Quarter. The Aggies were clinging to a 4-point lead, 17–13.

The 4th Quarter began with Manziel being sacked by Lerentee McCray, and the Aggies promptly punting. Starting with good field position at their own 38, the Gators' passing game came through and Driskel completed a 39-yard bomb to Omarius Hines down to the A&M 18. After a short Solomon Patton rush, Mike Gillislee took a pitch to the right side and tip-toed in bounds to score a 12-yard TD and take the lead 20–17. The A&M offense could not find an answer to the tough Gator defense and had to punt on the next drive. The Aggie defense did prevent Florida from extending the lead (due in part to yet another Driskel sack, his 8th of the game, this time by safety Floyd Raven Sr.) and gave the offense another chance. After 2 no-gain plays, Manziel scrambled for just over 9 yards and was marked just short of the 1st down. Unable to convert, they gave it back to Florida, who was again held to only 3 yards to give the Aggies one last chance with 6:10 remaining in the game. The drive looked hopeful: a few short gains moved the sticks twice, but after a false start on Lewis, the Aggies could not convert. On their own 39, they were forced to punt with only 3:13 left on the clock. Once the Gators got the ball, the Aggie defense could not slow them, giving up a 15-yard facemask penalty, a 12-yard Patton run, and a 21-yard Driskel rush, which allowed Florida to kneel the ball and take the rest of the time off the clock, ending the game 20–17.

Johnny Manziel finished the game 23-of-30 for 173 yards (his lowest total of the season) with no touchdowns or interceptions. He led the team in rushing yards with 60 on 17 attempts, averaging 3.5 (his 2nd lowest of the season). Mike Evans led the team in receiving with 7 catches for 60 yards. Notably, Damontre Moore had a career-high 3.0 sacks and a then-career-high 10.0 tackles, pitching in to the Aggies' 8.0 total sacks for a loss of 48 yards. He received the SEC Co-Defensive Lineman of the Week award for his performance. The loss dropped A&M's all-time record against Florida to 1–2. Although the Aggies began their SEC debut with a tough loss, hopes were still high for Kevin Sumlin's new team, and freshman QB Johnny Manziel looked promising.

SMU

Sources:
Official Texas A&M Game Notes (PDF)

    
    
    
    
    
    
    

Following their loss to Florida, the Aggies took on non-conference opponent SMU. The offense got off to a slow start, but came to life in the 2nd Quarter. After the Aggies scored 27 unanswered points, SMU made a field goal to get their only points of the game. A&M scored 21 more afterwards to make it a 48–3 rout. Johnny Manziel set an A&M freshman passing record with 294 yards and helped improve the Aggies' record to 1–1.

Texas A&M received the ball to start the game; however, the offense struggled for the first few possessions of the game. After losing 6 yards on a pass to Thomas Johnson, Manziel rushed for 11 but could not convert the 3rd and 16, forcing the first drive of the game to end in a punt. The Aggie defense looked strong though, and with SMU on 3rd and 8, DE Damontre Moore shined again, sacking quarterback Garrett Gilbert for a loss of 9. A&M then moved the chains once, but after a Manziel sack by Taylor Reed and a false start, they once again could not convert a 3rd and long. Deep in their own territory, the Mustangs put together a stronger 33-yard drive, but a series of incompletions forced yet another punt from Chase Hover. The Aggies' next drive was the most disastrous of the game, with a 7-yard Manziel sack by Margus Hunt and a False Start penalty, giving the drive a net gain of −12 yards. On SMU's next drive, Gilbert was sacked by DE Julien Obioha and fumbled the ball into the hands of SMU OL Ben Gottschalk for a loss of 5. With the ball back, Manziel completed a 38-yard pass to Mike Evans who bounced off of tackles to go down to the SMU 42-yard line. After failing to be able to run the ball, A&M attempted to convert a 4th and 2, but Manziel's pass to Malcome Kennedy was incomplete. After the Mustangs' offense was again stopped, they ended the quarter with a punt to A&M's Dustin Harris, who made a return for 20 yards before Kevin Pope forced a fumble into the hands of the Aggies' RB Trey Williams, who made an additional 17 yards on the return. The defense-dominated 1st Quarter ended at 0–0.

In the beginning of the 2nd Quarter, it looked as if the A&M offense was finally threatening, with Manziel completing another long 30-yard pass down the right sideline to Mike Evans at the SMU 12. Unable to convert, however, the Aggies had to kick a short field goal from the 5, but freshman Taylor Bertolet missed the 23-yarder. After holding SMU to 9 yards and a punt, A&M seemed to struggle on offense again, until Manziel completed a 22-yard pass to Evans on 4th and 4. They finally started to click, and a few plays later Manziel completed a slant to senior WR Ryan Swope who split the safeties and gave A&M the first points of the game on a 29-yard TD. After a pair of SMU punts, Manziel started the drive with a 48-yard scramble TD, but Bertolet's PAT was blocked by Hunt. Only 3 plays later Aggie DB Tramain Jacobs intercepted Garrett Gilbert to let the Aggies go on a 7-play, 73-yard drive capped off by a 26-yard TD pass slung on the run by Manziel to senior WR Uzoma Nwachukwu. After driving 44 yards, the Mustangs attempted a field goal but Chase Hover missed the 48-yarder to end the half with Texas A&M leading 20–0.

The Aggies forced a punt on SMU's first possession of the half. Back on offense the Aggies drove 37 yards, when, on 3rd and 9, Manziel shook off a would-be sack and threw an off-balance pass to Kenric McNeal, who avoided defenders to take the pass into the end zone for a 42-yard TD. On the Mustangs' next possession they drove 67 yards and scored their only points of the game on a Hover 25-yard field goal. On the ensuing drive, the Aggie offense continued to roll when Manziel ran for 25 yards and a 15-yard TD. For SMU, Gilbert was sacked by Moore, and then Dustin Harris returned the following punt for 36 yards. Later, Manziel connected with Nwachukwu for a 12-yard TD to extend the lead. The Mustangs finished the half down 41–3.

In the 4th Quarter the Aggies subbed in the 2nd string offense. Quarterback Jameill Showers led the offense 80 yards down field (with impressive passes to Thomas Johnson for 15 and 22 yards) and Trey Williams scored on a 2-yard run. The Aggies forced a punt and took time off the clock. To finish out the half, A&M held SMU to a turnover on downs and took the rest of the time off the clock to finish the game 48–3.

Johnny Manziel finished 20-of-36 for 294 yards and 4 TDs. He also rushed for an impressive 124 yards on 13 carries and 2 TDs. Evans and Swope had 6 catches for 123 yards and 5 catches for 70 yards and 1 TD, respectively. Damontre Moore had 2.0 sacks for a loss of 14. The victory improved A&M's all-time record against SMU to 43–29–7. Sumlin's Aggies seemed to be heating up, and the offense was looking more and more explosive being led by Manziel.

South Carolina State

Sources:
Official Texas A&M Game Notes (PDF)

    
    
    
    
    
    
    
    
    
    
    

After a convincing win over SMU, the Aggies took on non-conference opponent and FCS team South Carolina State. The Bulldogs were 1–2 heading into the competition, and the Aggies 1–1.

The Aggies took the field on offense first and started strong, but stalled out after a −2-yard run by Ryan Swope and a sack on Manziel by Justin Hughes. SC State's first drive yielded 0 yards and resulted in a punt by Nick Belcher. After a 19-yard return from A&M senior DB Dustin Harris, the Aggies started their drive on the SC State 33-yard line. They ran the ball successfully, and scored the first touchdown of the game on a 4-yard run by Ben Malena. The teams traded a few punts before the ball was back in the hands of Manziel and the A&M offense. The Aggies worked downfield, and Johnny Manziel capped off the drive by flipping 9-yard TD pass on the run to Uzoma Nwachukwu. When SC State went back on offense, they finally moved the ball effectively and had an explosive 17-yard run by Jalen Simmons for their first touchdown.

Texas A&M began the 2nd Quarter with a punt after struggling on offense, but it would be their last punt for the next 5 series. Following an unsuccessful drive by SC State, the Aggies had an explosive possession, highlighted by a 39-yard TD scramble by Manziel. After another Bulldog punt, the A&M offense exploded again. This time including a 23-yard pass to Thomas Johnson and yet another Manziel scramble, in which he went 20 yards and dove inside the right pylon for the touchdown. Once again South Carolina State failed to get a 1st down, and the Aggies had another great drive capped off by Johnny Manziel zipping a pass to Kenric McNeal for a 30-yard TD. The Bulldogs had to punt again, and after a 35-yard return from Dustin Harris, the Aggies had the ball. On the first play of the drive Manziel tossed a screen pass to Nwachukwu, who hurdled a defender and went 37 yards for the TD. After forcing another punt (the Bulldogs' 5th in a row), A&M's offense had the ball with 2:08 left in the half. However, it was only about 30 seconds until Manziel handed the ball off to Ben Malena, who exploded up the middle, broke a tackle, and went for a 50-yard touchdown. The Aggies scored an incredible 35 points in the 2nd Quarter, and headed to halftime in the lead 49–7.

South Carolina State opened up the 2nd half on offense with a 16-yard drive which stalled out and ended with a punt. The Aggies came into the half playing much of the 2nd string offense, including QB Jameill Showers. Showers threw 2 incomplete passes, and then an interception to Dominique Mitchell. However, when SC State had the ball, they once again could not get a first down and were forced to punt. Nick Belcher made a rugby style punt to the A&M 4-yard line. The ball was picked up by Dustin Harris, who swung to the right side of the field, cut through defenders, and sprinted up the right sideline for a 96-yard touchdown return (The 2nd longest in school history). The Bulldogs punted on their next possession, and the 2nd string Aggie offense went to work. They worked methodically worked their way down to the SC State 5-yard line to end the 3rd Quarter in the lead 56–7.

A&M began the 4th quarter with a 4th and 1 from the SC State 5-yard line. Showers handed the ball off to Christine Michael, who ran up the middle and pounded through SC State linebacker Joe Thomas for a 5-yard TD. When the Bulldogs got the ball back, they finally found success in the passing game: a 27-yard completion to Marcus Lloyd and a 39-yard touchdown throw to Lennel Elmore, which gave SC State their first points since the 1st Quarter. The Aggies returned on offense giving experience to younger players, and ran 9 plays before turning the ball over on downs. On the first play of the ensuing drive for SC State, QB Richard Cue attempted to find TE Temarrick Hemingway, but sophomore Aggie DB Deshazor Everett jumped the route, picked off the ball, and ran it 22 yards for the touchdown. On the following SC State possession, the Aggies played many 2nd string defenders who made some impressive plays including back-to-back sacks by Tyrell Taylor and Ivan Robinson. After moving the ball 30 yards, they punted to the Aggies, who ran out the last minute on the clock to win the game by a whopping 70–14.

The Aggies were led in passing by Manziel who completed 15 of 20 for 174 yards and 3 TDs, and led in rushing by Malena who had 11 carries for 88 yards and 2 TDs. He was followed closely by Manziel himself who had 8 attempts for 78 yards and 2 TDs. A&M was led in receiving by Nwachukwu and Johnson who had 2 receptions for 46 yards and 2 TDs and 3 receptions for 42 yards respectively. In addition, Dustin Harris broke both the school and 64-year standing SEC record for punt return yards in a game with 246 on 8 returns (an average of 30.75) while making the 2nd longest return in school history.  Finally, Damontre Moore had 3 tackles for a loss including 1 sack. This was the first game Texas A&M ever played against South Carolina State, so their all-time record vs the Bulldogs is 1–0.

Arkansas

The game featured the former Southwest Conference rivals in their first conference matchup since 1991 (Arkansas' last year in the SWC).

Though leading 10–7 after the first quarter, Arkansas would be shut out the remainder of the game in a blowout win for A&M. Johnny Manziel had a total of 453 yards passing and 104 yard rushing with a total of 3 touchdowns to lead the Aggies to a 58–10 win over Arkansas and led A&M to a 3–1 record.

Sources:
Official Texas A&M Game Notes (PDF)

Ole Miss

Sources:
Official Texas A&M Game Notes (PDF)

Louisiana Tech

Sources:
Official Texas A&M Game Notes (PDF)

    
    
    
    
    
    
    
    
    
    
    
    
    
    
    
    
    
    
    

The game was originally scheduled for August 30, 2011. On August 28, 2012 the Louisiana Tech Athletic department announced that the game would be postponed to October 13, 2012 (previously a bye week for both teams) anticipating that Hurricane Isaac could make travel for the teams and fans difficult or that the game time weather could be hazardous.

LSU

Sources:
Official Texas A&M Game Notes (PDF)

Auburn

Sources:
Official Texas A&M Game Notes (PDF)

Mississippi State

Sources:
Official Texas A&M Game Notes (PDF)

    
    
    
    
    
    
    

In honor of the 2000 Independence Bowl (dubbed "The Snow Bowl" due to a freak snowstorm that hit the Shreveport area before game time, which was the last game between the two schools), Mississippi State received a waiver to wear all white uniforms despite being the home team. In response to the Mississippi State uniforms, Adidas (the uniform provider for both teams) approached A&M head coach Kevin Sumlin with the idea of an all-black uniform for the Aggies. The uniform configuration unveiled to the team as a surprise in the locker room before the game.

Alabama

Sources:
Official Texas A&M Game Notes (PDF)

    
    
    
    
    
    
    
    

Texas A&M and Alabama have a long history of football coaches being at both schools (Bear Bryant, Gene Stallings, and Dennis Franchione) and had met 4 times previously, but this was Texas A&M's first-ever trip to Tuscaloosa. This game was also Texas A&M's 12th-ever game against the #1 ranked team.  The win catapulted quarterback Johnny Manziel into the national limelight and positioned him for serious Heisman trophy consideration.

Sam Houston State

Sources:
Official Texas A&M Game Notes (PDF)

Missouri

Sources:
Official Texas A&M Game Notes (PDF)

    
    
    
    
    
    
    
    
    
    
    
    
    

For the 3rd year in a row Texas A&M and Missouri played in College Station.

Oklahoma (Cotton Bowl Classic)

Sources:
Official Texas A&M Game Notes (PDF)

References

Texas AandM
Texas A&M Aggies football seasons
Cotton Bowl Classic champion seasons
Texas AandM Aggies football